ASRG can stand for:
Anti-Spam Research Group, a research group within the Internet Research Task Force.
Advanced Stirling Radioisotope Generator, a type of power system for spacecraft.